Devendra Prasad Yadav (born  26 November 1953) was a member of the 14th Lok Sabha of India. He represented the Jhanjharpur constituency of Bihar and was a member of the Rashtriya Janata Dal, Janata Dal (United) and Janata Dal.

He was the Secretary of Bihar Janata Party from 1977 to 1979 and was elected to Bihar Legislative Assembly from Phulparas but resigned for Karpoori Thakur who became the Chief Minister of Bihar. He was elected to Bihar Legislative Council and remained from May 1978 to November 1989. He was the National President of Yuva Lok Dal.

He was a Member of Parliament from Jhanjharpur from 1989 to 1998 and from 1999 to 2009. He was Union Cabinet Minister for Food, Civil Supplies, Consumer Affairs, and Public Distribution with an additional charge of Commerce in June 1996 in Deve Gowda ministry and Gujral ministry. During this tenure, he passed the Historical food bill for farmers which is praiseworthy.

He was deputy leader of Janata Dal (United) in Lok Sabha but left soon to join Rashtriya Janata Dal. He formed Samajwadi Janata Dal Democratic after leaving the Rashtriya Janata Dal but soon re-joined Janata Dal (United) by merging his party in it.

References

External links
 Home Page on the Parliament of India's Website
बिहार चुनाव 2020: ओवैसी का देवेंद्र यादव की पार्टी संग गठबंधन, कहा- लोग नीतीश से थके 

1953 births
Living people
People from Bihar
India MPs 2004–2009
Janata Dal (United) politicians
Janata Party politicians
Lok Dal politicians
Janata Dal politicians
Rashtriya Janata Dal politicians
Hindustani Awam Morcha politicians
Indian National Congress politicians
Samajwadi Party politicians
Lok Sabha members from Bihar
India MPs 1989–1991
India MPs 1991–1996
India MPs 1996–1997
India MPs 1999–2004
Members of the Bihar Legislative Assembly
Members of the Bihar Legislative Council
Commerce and Industry Ministers of India